Kepier School is a coeducational secondary school located in Houghton-le-Spring, England.

Kepier School offers GCSEs, BTECs and OCR Nationals as programmes of study for pupils. The school also operates a five-year football academy programme for gifted young players.

History
The school was built and endowed in 1574 by Bernard Gilpin, an influential clergyman who became known as the 'Apostle of the North' and was associated with Houghton-le-Spring.

The school has resided between 1990 and 2018 on the site of the former Sancroft School. It was built in 1974 though has had major renovations since it became Houghton Kepier School. The change of building was decided when Houghton-le-Spring Grammar, Shiney Row Comprehensive, Sancroft Comprehensive and Bernard Gilpin Comprehensive began a merger over the latter years of the 1980s.

On the merger, the schools were known as Houghton Kepier School, a name that lasted until 2003 when the school gained specialist Sports College status and was renamed Houghton Kepier Sports College. It became a foundation school in 2006 and converted to academy status in 2011. It wasn't until the incumbent headmistress Nicola Cooper joined the school in 2011 that further changes to the historic logo and name were made and introduced for the autumn term in 2012.

The original Royal Kepier Grammar School still stands off Church Street, though the building on Hetton Road used until 1990 is now demolished. In 2015, the school announced it was to demolish its current building and build a state-of-the-art three-storey academy on a disused sports field due to its dated design specifications and the presence of asbestos in the building's insulation.

In early September 2017 it was reported that students were forced to line up in the rain while the principal compared the students' trousers with a swatch of fabric supplied by Total Sport, to ensure the grey trousers were from this supplier. These cost £15.99, while similar products were available for £7.00 elsewhere. Students not wearing the "required" trousers were sent home. The school website, on its "Learner's Uniform" page, does not mention a specific supplier and describes the uniform not as grey, but as "black tailored school trousers".

A new school building was completed beside the original in September 2018, and was quoted by Ofsted to be 'Brigher and better for Learning,' alongside some new furnishings being fitted alongside originals from the older build, with the school continuing to offer its value for learning and high quality sporting facilities. Staff and pupils moved into the new building in January 2019.

Headteachers

Ofsted
The school has been inspected by the Ofsted five times since 2012. In 2012, the inspectors deemed it 'Satisfactory". Both inspections in 2013 saw the school judged as "Requires Improvement", with the inspectors commenting that leaders and managers do not always focus their actions where they are most needed and do not check the impact on students’ achievement. In 2016, the school had improved sufficiently to be rated as "Good", because of "... vastly raised teachers’ expectations of how quickly pupils can make progress in all of the subjects they study."

Notable former pupils
 Michael Adams, TV personality
 George Carleton, bishop
 William Romaine, divine
 Robert Surtees, antiquarian

Notable former staff
 Adam Walker, politician

References

External links
 

Secondary schools in the City of Sunderland
Educational institutions established in the 1570s
1574 establishments in England
Academies in the City of Sunderland